Saint Vincent and the Grenadines participated at the 2003 Pan American Games, held in Santo Domingo, Dominican Republic, from 1 to 17 August 2003.

Results by event

Athletics

Track

Road

Swimming

Men's competitions

See also
Saint Vincent and the Grenadines at the 2002 Central American and Caribbean Games
Saint Vincent and the Grenadines at the 2004 Summer Olympics

References

Nations at the 2003 Pan American Games
Pan American Games
2003